Capital Area Multimodal Gateway, also known as East Lansing station, is an intermodal transit  station in East Lansing, Michigan. Operated by the Capital Area Transportation Authority (CATA), it is served by Amtrak's  passenger train, local buses, and intercity buses. It opened in 2015 to replace a nearby Amtrak and bus station operating since 1974.

Description
The  station building includes a public waiting area, concessions, Amtrak and intercity bus ticket counters, and public restrooms. There are also three internal vestibules which can be accessed by users during the time the station is unstaffed and closed for the day. Outside are separate covered waiting areas for Amtrak and intercity bus riders, a bike storage area, a customer pick-up and drop-off area, and 150 long-term parking spaces.

Services 
Amtrak's Blue Water provides a single daily round-trip between Chicago, Illinois and Port Huron, Michigan. Amtrak Thruway Motorcoach provides a connection to long-distance trains in Toledo, Ohio. Indian Trails, in partnership with Greyhound, offers long-distance bus service to various destinations in Michigan. Megabus served the station from 2013 to 2016.

Local CATA bus routes 20, 35, 39 stop at the station, and the facility also offers taxicab and bike-sharing. The property also has space on its south end of the site along the CSX Plymouth Subdivision to construct an additional platform for future passenger rail services if needed.

History

Historically, the major railroad depots in the Lansing metropolitan area were the Union Station and the Grand Trunk Western Station, both in Lansing. With the establishment of Amtrak in 1971, both stations lost their train service. Amtrak subsequently took over a building in East Lansing to serve as a station for its planned Blue Water train. This building had been built as a storage facility for Michigan State University in 1971. The Blue Water began servicing this facility on September 15, 1974. The service was renamed the Blue Water Limited on October 26, 1975, and became the International Limited on October 31, 1982, when the eastern terminus was extended to Toronto. The International Limited was operated jointly by Via Rail and Amtrak until it was discontinued in 2004 and replaced with the modern Blue Water line.

 Plans for the new station complex, the Capital Area Multimodal Gateway, were announced in 2010, and originally included a new parking structure and improved bus facilities as well as bicycle parking. The project was intended to replace the older Amtrak station with updated facilities, and to consolidated rail and bus service into one intermodal transit station. The project was awarded a $6.3 million grant in July 2012 by the U.S. Department of Transportation's Federal Transit Administration, and by then the parking structure had been dropped from the plan. In addition to the construction costs, CATA paid a $3.2 million long-term lease for the site. The station property also included facilities for intercity bus service. Site work began in late July 2014, and included demolition of the old Michigan State University Surplus Store and Printing Services buildings on-site.

The original station closed after the last train departed on January 25, 2016, and operations moved to the newly built station located a few yards to the west.

Passenger statistics

Notable places nearby
Michigan State University
Lansing, Michigan
Union Depot

See also
History of railroads in Michigan

References

External links

East Lansing-Lansing Amtrak Station (USA Rail Guide -- Trains Web)

Amtrak stations in Michigan
East Lansing, Michigan
Michigan State University
Transportation in Lansing, Michigan
Buildings and structures in Ingham County, Michigan
Transit centers in the United States